I Had a New York Girlfriend is the third album by Robert Forster. It consists of cover versions of his favourite songs and unlike his previous albums contains no original compositions.

Critical reception
Trouser Press called the collection "quirky enough to maintain a distinctly confessional quality."

Track listing
Side one
 "Nature's Way" (Randy California) – 2:25
 "Broken Hearted People" (Guy Clark) – 3:47
 "Echo Beach" (Mark Gane) – 2:53
 "Tell Me That It Isn't True" (Bob Dylan) – 2:36
 "2541" (Grant Hart) – 3:46
 "Anytime" (Herbert "Happy" Lawson) – 3:55
Side two
"Locked Away" (Steve Jordan, Keith Richards) – 3:27
 "Look Out (Here Comes Tomorrow)" (Neil Diamond) – 2:49
 "Alone" (Tom Kelly, Billy Steinberg) – 3:12
 "Bird" (Michael Hansonis) – 4:47
 "Frisco Depot" (Mickey Newbury) – 2:36
 "3 A.M." (Bill Anderson, Jerry Todd) – 2:29

Personnel
Robert Forster – guitar, vocals, handclaps
Suzy Ahearn – backing vocals
Gordy Blair – bass
Warren Ellis – violin
Dave Graney – growl
Mark C. Halstead – backing vocals
Mick Harvey – bass, guitar, backing vocals
Rod Hayward – guitar
Graham Lee – pedal steel, backing vocals
Clare Moore – drums, backing vocals, handclaps
Charlie Owen – guitar, dobro
Andy Parsons – backing vocals
Conway Savage – organ, piano, backing vocals, handclaps
Rob Snarski – backing vocals

References

1995 albums
Robert Forster (musician) albums
Beggars Banquet Records albums
Covers albums